Icriocarcinus is an extinct genus of crab from the Maastrichtian or Campanian of Baja California, Mexico, and Merced County, California, United States.

References

Goneplacoidea
Late Cretaceous crustaceans
Monotypic arthropod genera
Cretaceous arthropods of North America
Late Cretaceous animals of North America
Cretaceous California
Cretaceous Mexico
Fossil taxa described in 1988
Fossils of Mexico
Fossils of California